Blood Drive may refer to:

Donation
Blood drive, campaigns and special events to solicit blood donations

Games
Blood Drive (video game), a 2010 vehicular combat video game for Xbox 360 and PlayStation 3
Corpse Party: Blood Drive, a 2014 survival horror adventure video game for PlayStation Vita

Music
Blood Drive (album), of 2013 by ASG

Television
Blood Drive (TV series), Syfy television series
"Blood Drive" (Beavis and Butt-head episode)
"Blood Drive" (The Office), the sixteenth episode of the fifth season of the television series The Office
"Blood Drive", an episode from Scream Queens (season 2)